Tərkeş (also, Tarkesh and Terkesh) is a village and municipality in the Oghuz Rayon of Azerbaijan.  It has a population of 543.

References 

Populated places in Oghuz District